Prismophonic is the name given to the third album by Christophe Willem. It was released on 21 November 2011 and currently has three singles, Cool, Si Mes Larmes Tombent and Starlite.

The first single, Cool, was released on 20 September 2011. It was released as both a physical and digital single.

Fellow French Singer Zaho features on the album during the song Indelebile and big names such as Kylie Minogue are credited. Kylie is credited as the writer of the song Pas Si Loin.

Prismophonic is the 16th best pop album of 2011, according to Popjustice.com.

Prismophonic was released in both a standard and collector's edition format. The collector's edition includes a bonus DVD and comes in a silver/grey box.

Track listing
Starlite 3:33
Cool 3:14
L'amour Me Gagne 4:14
Si Mes Larmes Tombent 3:56
Indelebile feat Zaho 3:47
Jamais Du 3:33
Ennemis In L.O.V.E 3:42
Automatik 3:51
Pas Si Loin 3:09
Je Rejoins La Scene 3:46
Le Temps Qu'il Reste 4:04
Falling 5:26

Collector's edition track listing
Starlite 3:33
Cool 3:14
L'amour Me Gagne 4:14
Si Mes Larmes Tombent 3:56
Indelebile feat Zaho 3:47
Jamais Du 3:33
Ennemis In L.O.V.E 3:42
Automatik 3:51
Pas Si Loin 3:09
Je Rejoins La Scene 3:46
Le Temps Qu'il Reste 4:04
Falling 5:26
Bonus DVD
Making of Prismophonic
W&Z - Question Responses by Willem and Zaho
Cool - Le Clip

Charts

Weekly charts

Year-end charts

Certification

References

2011 albums
Christophe Willem albums
Columbia Records albums